Since independence, with Jaja Wachuku as the first Minister for Foreign Affairs and Commonwealth Relations, later called External Affairs, Nigerian foreign policy has been characterised by a focus on Africa as a regional power and by attachment to several fundamental principles: African unity and independence; capability to exercise hegemonic influence in the region: peaceful settlement of disputes; non-alignment and non-intentional interference in the internal affairs of other nations; and regional economic cooperation and development. In carrying out these principles, Nigeria participates in the African Union, the Economic Community of West African States (ECOWAS), the Non-Aligned Movement, the Commonwealth of Nations, and the United Nations.

Nigeria and the liberation of Africa

Upon gaining independence in 1960, Nigeria quickly committed itself to improving the lives of the people of the country and harnessing the resources that remain vital to the economy of the country and her neighbours. By observing at what benefits and appropriate for the country, Nigeria became one of the founding members of the Organisation for African Unity (OAU), which later became the African Union. The Organisation for African Unity checks political stability of any African countries and encourages them to be holding regional meetings for the union. Nigeria backed the African National Congress (ANC) by taking a committed tough line with regard to the South African government and their military actions in southern Africa. Nigeria and Organisation for African Unity (OAU, now the African Union), has tremendous influence in West Africa nations and Africa on the whole. Nigeria has additionally founded regional cooperative efforts in West Africa, functioning as standard-bearer for ECOWAS and ECOMOG, economic and military organisations, respectively.

Similarly, when civil war broke out in Angola after the country gained independence from Portugal in 1975, Nigeria mobilised its diplomatic influence in Africa in support of the Popular Movement for the Liberation of Angola (MPLA). That support helped tip the balance in their favour, which led to OAU recognition of the MPLA over the National Union for the Total Independence of Angola.

Nigeria extended diplomatic support to another cause, Sam Nujoma's Southwest Africa People's Organization in Namibia, to stall the apartheid South African-installed government there. In 1977, the new General Olusegun Obasanjo's military regime donated $20 million to the Zimbabwean movement against the apartheid government of Rhodesia. Nigeria also sent military equipment to Mozambique to help the newly independent country suppress the South African-backed Mozambican National Resistance guerrillas. Nigeria also provided some military training at the Kaduna first mechanised army division and other material support to Joshua Nkomo and Robert Mugabe's guerrilla forces during the  Zimbabwe War in 1979 against the white minority rule of Prime Minister Ian Douglas Smith, which was backed by the apartheid -government of South Africa.

Due to mismanagement of its economy and technology, Nigeria announced that it was launching a nuclear programme of "unlimited scope" of its own but failed. After the Nigerian Independence in 1960, Nigeria demonstrated its seriousness in improving the economy for the people and embarked on nationalizing some multi-national companies that traded with and broke the economic/trade embargo of the apartheid South African regime, the local operations of Barclays Bank was nationalised after that bank ignored the strong protests by the Nigeria populace.

Nigeria also nationalised the British Petroleum (BP) for supplying oil to South Africa. In 1982, the Alhaji Shehu Shagari government urged the visiting Pontiff Pope John Paul II to grant audience to the leaders of Southern Africa guerrilla organisations Oliver Tambo of the ANC and Sam Nujoma of SWAPO. In December 1983, the new Major General Muhammadu Buhari regime announced that Nigeria could no longer afford an apartheid government in Africa. however, Nigeria being the foremost black nation on Earth due to its population, Nigeria has great potential and will soon grow to be a force to reckon with on the global stage.

Nigeria and West Africa

In pursuing the goal of regional economic cooperation and development, Nigeria helped create ECOWAS, which seeks to harmonise trade and investment practices for its 16 West African member countries, ultimately achieve a full customs union, and establish a single currency. Nigeria also has taken the lead in articulating the views of developing nations on the need for modification of the existing international economic order.

Nigeria has played a central role in the ECOWAS efforts to end the civil war in Liberia and contributed the bulk of the ECOWAS peacekeeping forces sent there in 1990. Nigeria also has provided the bulk of troops for ECOMOG forces in Sierra Leone.

Nigeria has enjoyed generally good relations with its immediate neighbours.
Nigeria has actively played a leading role in West Africa, with enormous  military power, Nigeria has been perpetual in its aim of promoting peace and stability in Africa's most prosperous region for more than three decades.

Nigeria and International Organisations

Nigeria is a member of the following organizations:

 African, Caribbean and Pacific Group of States
 African Development Bank
 African Union
 Commission on Science and Technology for Sustainable Development in the South
 Commonwealth of Nations
 Economic Community of West African States
 Food and Agriculture Organization
 Group of 15
 G-19
 Group of 24
 Group of 77
 International Atomic Energy Agency
 International Bank for Reconstruction and Development
 International Chamber of Commerce
 International Civil Aviation Organization
 International Criminal Court
 International Development Association
 International Finance Corporation
 International Fund for Agricultural Development
 International Hydrographic Organization
 International Labour Organization
 International Monetary Fund
 International Maritime Organization
 International Mobile Satellite Organization
 International Olympic Committee
 International Organization for Standardization
 International Red Cross and Red Crescent Movement
 International Telecommunication Union
 Interpol
 Non-Aligned Movement
 Organisation for the Prohibition of Chemical Weapons
 Organization of Petroleum Exporting Countries
 Organization of Islamic Cooperation
 Permanent Court of Arbitration
 United Nations
 United Nations Conference on Trade and Development
 United Nations Economic Commission for Africa
 United Nations Educational, Scientific and Cultural Organization
 United Nations High Commissioner for Refugees
 United Nations Industrial Development Organization
 United Nations Iraq-Kuwait Observation Mission
 United Nations Institute for Training and Research
 United Nations Interim Administration Mission in Kosovo
 United Nations Mission for the Referendum in Western Sahara
 United Nations Mission in Bosnia and Herzegovina
 United Nations Mission of Observers in Prevlaka
 United Nations Mission of Observers in Tajikistan
 United Nations University
 Universal Postal Union
 World Confederation of Labour
 World Customs Organization
 World Federation of Trade Unions
 World Health Organization
 World Intellectual Property Organization
 World Meteorological Organization
 World Tourism Organization
 World Trade Organization

The Babangida regime joined the Organisation of the Islamic Conference (OIC, now the Organisation of Islamic Cooperation), though President Obasanjo has indicated he might reconsider Nigeria's membership.comments are being made for Nigeria to establish more bilateral relations.

Africa

Americas

Asia

Europe

Oceania

International disputes

Delimitation of international boundaries in the vicinity of Lake Chad, the lack of which led to border incidents in the past, has been completed and awaits ratification by Cameroon, Chad, Niger, and Nigeria; dispute with Cameroon over land and maritime boundaries around the Bakasi Peninsula is currently before the International Court of Justice; maritime boundary dispute with Equatorial Guinea because of disputed jurisdiction over oil-rich areas in the Gulf of Guinea.

Nigeria and the Commonwealth of Nations

The Federation of Nigeria became independent from the United Kingdom in 1960 with Queen Elizabeth II as Queen of Nigeria. Nigeria became a republic in the Commonwealth of Nations in 1963, when the Governor-General of Nigeria, Nnamdi Azikiwe became the first President of Nigeria.

Nigeria was suspended from the Commonwealth of Nations from 1995 until 1999, when its full membership was restored.

See also
 Jaja Wachuku - First Nigerian Foreign Affairs Minister
 List of diplomatic missions in Nigeria
 List of diplomatic missions of Nigeria

References

External links

 

 
Nigeria and the Commonwealth of Nations